|}

The Dante Stakes is a Group 2 flat horse race in Great Britain open to three-year-old horses. It is run over a distance of 1 mile, 2 furlongs and 56 yards at York in May.

History
The event is named after Dante, the Yorkshire-trained winner of the Derby substitute at Newmarket in 1945. Established in 1958, it serves as a major trial for the Derby. The first running was won by Bald Eagle.

The present race grading system was introduced in 1971, and the Dante Stakes initially held Group 3 status. It was promoted to Group 2 level in 1980.

In total, eleven winners of the race have achieved victory in the Derby. The first was St Paddy in 1960, and the most recent was Desert Crown in 2022. The 2014 Dante Stakes winner, The Grey Gatsby, subsequently won France's equivalent of the Derby, the Prix du Jockey-Club while the 2015 runner-up, Jack Hobbs, and 2021 winner Hurricane Lane, both won the Irish Derby.

The Dante Stakes is currently staged on the second day of York's three-day Dante Festival meeting.

Records

Leading jockey (6 wins):
 Pat Eddery – Beldale Flutter (1981), Hot Touch (1983), Damister (1985), Red Glow (1988), Sanglamore (1990), Tenby (1993)

Leading trainer (7 wins):
 Henry Cecil – Approval (1970), Lyphard's Wish (1979), Hello Gorgeous (1980), Simply Great (1982), Claude Monet (1984), Reference Point (1987), Tenby (1993)
 Sir Michael Stoute - Shahrastani (1986), Alnasr Alwasheek (1992), Dilshaan (2001), North Light (2004), Tartan Bearer (2008), Carlton House (2011), Desert Crown (2022)

Winners

See also
 Horse racing in Great Britain
 List of British flat horse races

References

 Paris-Turf:
 Racing Post:

 galopp-sieger.de – Dante Stakes.
 ifhaonline.org – International Federation of Horseracing Authorities – Dante Stakes (2019).
 pedigreequery.com – Dante Stakes – York.
 
 Race Recordings 

Flat horse races for three-year-olds
York Racecourse
Flat races in Great Britain
1958 establishments in England
Recurring sporting events established in 1958